Sprecher is a surname. Notable people with the surname include:

Ben Sprecher, Broadway producer and theater owner
Jeffrey  Sprecher (born 1955), American businessman
Jill Sprecher, American film director
Lorrie Sprecher, novelist, poet, and punk musician
Robert Arthur Sprecher (1917–1982), United States federal judge
Samuel Sprecher, Wittenberg University president from 1849–1874

See also
Sprecher Brewery, brewery in Wisconsin
Sprecher's shunt, metabolic pathway

German-language surnames